Joseph Assaf  (Arabic: جوزيف عساف; born 1944) is a Lebanese-born Australian businessman and founder of the Ethnic Business Awards.

Biography
Assaf was born in Hardine, a village in the Batroun District, 80 km from Beirut, Lebanon. His first language was Arabic, and he undertook his schooling in French. In 1967, at the age of 22, he migrated to Australia from Lebanon.

In 1988, Assaf founded the Ethnic Business Awards.

In June 2013, Australian Prime Minister Julia Gillard announced the appointment of Assaf to the Civil Society 20 group – the C20 – as part of the wider engagement process for the G20 meeting in Australia in 2014.

In 2008, Jascom International Pty Ltd published Assaf's book In Someone Else's Shoes, a memoir detailing his experiences as a migrant in Australia. It also explores his understanding of Australian society in the context of multiculturalism.

Honours and awards
On 14 June 2010, Assaf was named a Member of the Order of Australia "for service to multiculturalism, to business in the fields of marketing and communications, and to the community as a supporter of a range of charitable organisations."

On 11 June 2018, Assaf was named an Officer of the Order of Australia "for distinguished service to multiculturalism, and to business, as a supporter of community education projects for people from linguistically diverse backgrounds, and to cultural harmony and inclusion."

In 2019 the City of Canada Bay in New South Wales named Assaf citizen of the year.

References

External links 
 
 Ethnic Business Awards
 "Diversity in the Workplace", speech given in 1995 by Assaf and published at the Australian Government's Department of Immigration and Citizenship website

1944 births
Living people
Australian businesspeople
Members of the Order of Australia
Officers of the Order of Australia
Lebanese emigrants to Australia